The 1930 Iowa gubernatorial election was held on November 4, 1930. Republican nominee Dan W. Turner defeated Democratic nominee Fred P. Hagemann with 65.74% of the vote.

General election

Candidates
Major party candidates
Dan W. Turner, Republican
Fred P. Hagemann, Democratic 

Other candidates
John M. Smith, Farmer–Labor
William Patten, Communist

Results

References

1930
Iowa
Gubernatorial